Midfield is the part of a sports field that lies approximately in the center. In American football, association football (soccer) and field hockey, it is the area in and around the center circle, as well as the players who occupy that region. In rugby it is the area occupied by the players in the center positions.

The term "midfield" in baseball and cricket is used to describe the area between the infield (within the bases or near the wickets) and the outfield.

In American football, "midfield" refers to the halfway line.

See also
Midfielder

References

Terminology used in multiple sports